The French Ambassador in Amman is the representative of the government in Paris (France) next the government of Jordan.

List of representatives

.

References 

 
Jordan
France